Cloeon is a cosmopolitan genus of mayflies of the family Baetidae.

Species
 Cloeon degrangei
 Cloeon dipterum (formerly C. cognatum, C. inscriptum)
 Cloeon fluviatile
 Cloeon languidum
 Cloeon nandirum
 Cloeon paradieniense
 Cloeon petropolitanum
 Cloeon praetextum
 Cloeon schoenemundi
 Cloeon simile
 Cloeon tasmaniae
 Cloeon virens

Mayfly genera
Taxa named by William Elford Leach